Newtownshandrum is a small village in County Cork, Ireland located  west of Charleville on the R515 road. The name translates from Irish to mean 'new town of the old ridge'. Historic maps from 1829–1841 and 1897–1913 identify the village as Newtown. Newtownshandrum is within the Dáil constituency of Cork North-West.

Education
Shandrum National School is a co-educational primary school located in the village.  As of 2019, the school had approximately 140 pupils with five mainstream teachers, and two special education teachers.

Sports
The local Gaelic Athletic Association team is Newtownshandrum GAA Club.

See also
 List of towns and villages in Ireland

References

Towns and villages in County Cork